Olena Kholosha (born 26 January 1982) is a Ukrainian high jumper. Kholosha won a bronze medal at the European Athletics championships in Helsinki by jumping a height of 1.92 m.

Competition record

External links 
 

1982 births
Living people
Sportspeople from Cherkasy
Ukrainian female high jumpers
Athletes (track and field) at the 2012 Summer Olympics
Olympic athletes of Ukraine
European Athletics Championships medalists
21st-century Ukrainian women